Norman Field (27 August 1927 – 1993) was an English professional footballer who played in the Football League for Mansfield Town.

References

1927 births
1993 deaths
English footballers
Association football midfielders
English Football League players
Portsmouth F.C. players
Mansfield Town F.C. players